Michael College of Engineering and Technology was established in the year 2009. It is a technical institution offering undergraduate and postgraduate programs in various disciplines of engineering and technology. The college is located 15 km from Madurai on Madurai Sivagangai Main Road. This college is part of St. Michael Group of Institutions. The college has ISO 9001:2008 certification.

Departments
The academic departments of the college are:
Automobile Engineering
Civil Engineering
Computer Science and Engineering
Electronics and Communication Engineering
Electrical and Electronics Engineering
Mechanical Engineering

Undergraduate courses (4 years) 
Bachelor of Engineering degree in 
Automobile Engineering,
Civil Engineering,
Computer Science and Engineering,
Electronics and Communication Engineering,
Electrical and Electronics Engineering,
Mechanical Engineering

Postgraduate courses (2 years) 
Master of Engineering degree in
Thermal Engineering,
Embedded System Technologies,
Computer Science and Engineering

References

External links 
 

All India Council for Technical Education
Engineering colleges in Tamil Nadu
Colleges in Madurai
Engineering colleges in Madurai
Science and technology in Madurai